Beatrice III of Bigorre (died 1194), was a Countess regnant suo jure of Bigorre in 1178-1194.

References

 Davezac-Macaya, Essai historique sur le Bigorre

Counts of Bigorre
12th-century women rulers
1194 deaths
Year of birth unknown